Takuma Kanaiwa is a New York City based musician and electrical engineer. His music is known for transcending genres such as free jazz and Japanese folk. He also manufactures guitar effects pedals.

Partial discography
The Lemurian Sounds of Takuma Kanaiwa
Pegado Aficionado
Djoukojou
Seeds of Djuke

References

Date of birth missing (living people)
Living people
Guitarists from New York (state)
People from New York City
Year of birth missing (living people)
Jazz musicians from New York (state)